The 2007 Skycity Triple Crown is the sixth round of the 2007 V8 Supercar season. It took place on the weekend of 22 to 24 June at Hidden Valley Raceway in Northern Territory.

External links
V8 Supercar website

Darwin
June 2007 sports events in Australia
Sport in Darwin, Northern Territory
2000s in the Northern Territory
Motorsport in the Northern Territory